Dinners Ready is a franchised meal preparation business based in Mukilteo, Washington, United States. The company was founded by Brad Vorhees and Scott Farrar in 2003. Vorhees left the company in 2005. Mr. Farrar was named one of Seattle's top 25 innovators of 2006 by the Seattle Business Monthly. Dinners Ready is currently located in the Seattle area.  Dinners Ready was part of the food industry referred to as meal assembly, where customers can visit a local preparation kitchen and assemble meals to freeze and cook at home. The model has evolved to be predominantly delivery-only. The meals serve two, four, or six people and come complete with side dishes. There are twenty meal choices, with the menu changing each month.

See also
 Dream Dinners
 Super Suppers

External links

 https://www.nytimes.com/2005/08/28/business/yourmoney/28meals.html?_r=1&pagewanted=all%7Ctitle=You Made the Meatloaf
 http://www.boiseweekly.com/boise/fast-food-that-isnt/Content?oid=928307
 http://www.gazette.net/stories/072507/busimlo223805_32357.shtml

Food and drink companies of the United States
Companies based in Mukilteo, Washington